Oxspring is a civil parish in the metropolitan borough of Barnsley, South Yorkshire, England.  The parish contains two listed buildings that are recorded in the National Heritage List for England.  Both the listed buildings are designated at Grade II, the lowest of the three grades, which is applied to "buildings of national importance and special interest".  The parish contains the village of Oxspring and the surrounding area.  Both the listed buildings are bridges over the River Don


Buildings

References

Citations

Sources

Lists of listed buildings in South Yorkshire
Buildings and structures in the Metropolitan Borough of Barnsley